Road House is a 1928 American silent drama film directed by Richard Rosson and starring Maria Alba, Warren Burke and Lionel Barrymore.

Cast
 Maria Alba as Spanish Marla  
 Warren Burke as Larry Grayson  
 Lionel Barrymore as Henry Grayson  
 Julia Swayne Gordon as Mrs. Henry Grayson  
 Tempe Pigott as Grandma Grayson  
 Florence Allen as Helen Grayson  
 Eddie Clayton as Jim, Larry Grayson's Pal  
 Jack Oakie as Sam  
 Jane Keckley as Maid  
 Kay Bryant as Mary, Larry's Girlfriend

References

Bibliography
 Solomon, Aubrey. The Fox Film Corporation, 1915-1935. A History and Filmography. McFarland & Co, 2011.

External links

1928 films
1928 drama films
Silent American drama films
Films directed by Richard Rosson
American silent feature films
1920s English-language films
American black-and-white films
Fox Film films
1920s American films